Nicky Smith or Nicola Smith may refer to:
Nicola Smith (born 1949), English bridge player
Nicky Smith (RAF officer) (born c. 1969), British RAF officer, the first woman to command an RAF flying squadron
Nicky Smith (English footballer) (born 1969), English footballer
Nicky Smith (New Zealand footballer) (born 1980), New Zealand woman international footballer
Nicky Smith (rugby union) (born 1994), Welsh rugby union player